Ponmaalai Pozhudhu is a 2013 Indian Tamil film directed by A. C. Durai and produced by Amritha Gowri. Inspired from a real-life incident, the film features Aadhav Kannadasan and Gayathrie in the lead roles. The music was composed by C. Sathya. with cinematography by Rajavel Olhiveeran  and editing by Ramsudharan. The film released on 30 August 2013.

Cast
 Aadhav Kannadasan as Arjun
Speaking to The New Indian Express, Aadhav described his role as a "school boy". He was 86 kg, and had to shed 12 kilos for the role. Director Durai made him hang out with the four school children in the film to imbibe their body language.
 Gayathrie as Divya
 Kishore as Arjun's father
 Aruldoss as Divya's father
 Anupama Kumar as Arjun's mother
 Safeena Abid
 Ananth Ram
 Rahul

Soundtrack

The film's score and soundtrack were composed by C.Sathya of Engeyum Eppodhum fame. It was released on 4 June 2012 at Sathyam in Chennai by Kamal Haasan.

Release
After being delayed for over a year, the film was scheduled to release on 26 July 2013, however it was postponed to August 2013 due to shortage of screens. It is scheduled to release on 30 August 2013.

Reception
Ponmaalai Pozhudhu opened to mixed reviews, with consistent praises for the performances of Anupama Kumar and Kishore. Baradwaj Rangan of The Hindu said, " Ponmaalai Pozhudhu could have been a Maro Charitra/Ek Duuje Ke Liye for the Facebook generation – but the film, too often, reaches for tired old tropes" and added "Kishore and Anupama Kumar, as the parents of Arjun (Aadhav Kannadasan), the protagonist, recede into their roles with quiet professionalism; " IANS rated the film 2 out of 5, calling it "Good story, bad execution" and said, "Aadhav and Gayathrie hit it off as an aimless young pair, but miss the energy to create ripples with their performances. Kishore and Anupama Kumar as Aadhav's parents are the best characters in the entire film.", The new Indian express mentioned " Verdict: The film is a promising effort by a debutant director."

References

External links
 

2013 films
2010s Tamil-language films